Locmiquélic is a commune in the Morbihan department of Brittany in north-western France.

Toponymy
From the Breton loc which means hermitage (cf.: Locminé) and miquélic which means Little Michael.

Demographics
Inhabitants of Locmiquélic are called in French Locmiquélicains or Minahouëts.

See also
Communes of the Morbihan department

References

External links
 Mayors of Morbihan Association 

Communes of Morbihan